Sarofim may refer to:

Sarofim (surname)
Sarofim Hall, part of Houston's Hobby Center for the Performing Arts